Muriel Myee Steinbeck (21 July 1913 – 20 July 1982) was an Australian actress who worked extensively in radio, theatre, television and film. She is best known for her performance as the wife of Sir Charles Kingsford Smith in Smithy (1946) and for playing the lead role in Autumn Affair (1958–59), Australia's first television serial.

Filmink magazine later said "Steinbeck’s appeal was a little like that of Greer Garson in Hollywood – a regal, lady-like figure. That’s an over-simplification – she played all sorts of roles – but she was, overall, a classy dame. Her beauty meant that her photo often appeared in trade publications and she was particularly popular on radio soaps and at the Minerva Theatre in Sydney."

Biography

Early life
The youngest of the four children of William Martin Steinbeck and Lily Clarissa (née Batten), Muriel Steinbeck was born in Broken Hill, New South Wales, where her father was working as a headmaster. Her family left Broken Hill when Muriel was five. She was educated at Newcastle and Sydney Girls High (1926–1930), and when the family moved to Sydney she became involved in amateur theatre, appearing in plays such as The Merchant of Venice, Exit John Barcombe and A Midsummer Night's Dream and becoming renowned for her performances in comedy and drama.

She was seen in a production of Where the Crash Comes by Lawrence H. Cecil of the ABC. He hired her to do radio drama and her career was launched. Her first radio play was The Silver Cord and her first serial lead was The Three Diggers (1938). She was later briefly under contract to James Raglan while he was producing at Colombia where she starred in Soldier of Fortune.

Minerva
Steinbeck began appearing on the stage regularly at the Minerva Theatre in Kings Cross. She was in such productions as Spring Tide (1941), Claudia (1942), Watch on the Rhine (1942), Janie (1943), and The Amazing Dr Clitterhouse (1943).

Films
Steinbeck made her film debut in a wartime propaganda short, Eleventh Hour (1942), directed by Ken G. Hall. Hall then used her in another short, South West Pacific (1943).

Steinbeck made her feature film  debut in A Son is Born (1946), a melodrama where she played the lead role, a woman who marries unhappily (to Peter Finch), and has an ungrateful son (played by Ron Randell). According to Filmink "this is a perfectly fine soapie, with Steinbeck suffering and smiling through the tears. She has beauty and charisma and holds her own against three men who would all become major names."

Its release was delayed to take advantage of publicity for her second film, Smithy, directed by Hall, a biopic of Charles Kingsford Smith (played by Randell) where Steinbeck played his wife. The film was a big commercial success but Australia made so few films at the time Steinbeck focused on radio and theatre work. (Steinbeck later said the success of the film hurt her theatre career for a while as producers assumed she would be too expensive to hire. ) According to Filmink "Steinbeck might have considered going overseas herself – many female actors did so at the time, like Mary Maguire, Jocelyn Howarth and Shirley Ann Richards... But Steinbeck elected to stay home – she had a daughter, and her marriage was breaking up, and it was probably a bad time to rock the boat. Besides, in the late forties she had plenty of work on radio and stage. Such was her profile, she even endorsed chocolate and lipstick. "

She continued to work at the Minerva, appearing in Dangerous Corner (1946), The Third Visitor (1946), Clutterbuck (1947), and I Have Been Here Before (1948).

At the Independent she was in The Merchant of Venice (1951).  She appeared in numerous radio serials in the 1950s including Blue Hills, Portia Faces Life and Gabrielle. One of her co-stars Bruce Stewart later recalled "she was a bit in the business of descending from on high."

Steinbeck had roles in a horse racing melodrama, Into the Straight (1949), and another biopic, Wherever She Goes (1951), playing the mother of Eileen Joyce. Filmink argued "The filmmakers would have been better off building the movie(s) around Steinbeck... But then, Australian cinema has traditionally demonstrated a poor understanding how best to exploit potential stars."

She was in the film Long John Silver (1954) and the ensuring series The Adventures of Long John Silver (1954), playing the wife of the governor.

Television
Steinbeck starred in Australia's first TV serial, Autumn Affair (1958). In the words of Filmink "Steinbeck played Julia Parrish, middle aged widowed mother who wrote popular novels and had a busy private life. She laughed, loved and suffered with jolly good decency – the quintessential Muriel Steinbeck part."

She was in two one-off TV dramas, Reflections in Dark Glasses (1960) and Thunder on Sycamore Street (1961) and had a recurring role in a serial, Stormy Petrel (1960).

In 1961 she was in Merchant of Venice at the Elizabethan Theatre Trust.

From 1963 she was a regular member of the ABC's program 'English for New Australians' and she compared Woman's World.

She was in Heartbreak House (1964) at the Old Tote.

Her final film role was in They're a Weird Mob (1966) playing the wife of Chips Rafferty.

Personal life
She was married to her first husband, a journalist, from 7 July 1934 until their divorce in 1949. They had a daughter, born in 1939.

She then married company manager and engineer Brian Dudley Nicholson in 1951.

Retirement
Retiring from acting in 1966, she accompanied her husband to Orange, New South Wales, and became a teacher of the arts, including running a drama school and authoring a book titled On Stage: A Practical Guide To the Actor's Craft.

She died of cancer on 20 July 1982, aged 68.

Filmography

References

External links
 
 Muriel Steinbeck Australian theatre credits at AusStage
 Muriel Steinbeck at the National Film and Sound Archive
Sally O'Neill, 'Steinbeck, Muriel Myee (1913–1982)', Australian Dictionary of Biography, National Centre of Biography, Australian National University, http://adb.anu.edu.au/biography/steinbeck-muriel-myee-15546/text26758, published first in hardcopy 2012, accessed online 30 April 2018.

Australian film actresses
1913 births
1982 deaths
Australian stage actresses
Australian radio actresses
Australian television actresses
20th-century Australian actresses
Drama teachers